Oolenoy Baptist Church Cemetery is a historic Baptist church cemetery located near Pickens, Pickens County, South Carolina.  It was established about 1798, and contains 839 marked graves, with headstones, footstones, and a few plot enclosures.

It was added to the National Register of Historic Places in 2003.

References

External links

 
 
 

Baptist cemeteries in the United States
Cemeteries in South Carolina
National Register of Historic Places in Pickens County, South Carolina
1798 establishments in South Carolina
Cemeteries on the National Register of Historic Places in South Carolina